Bill Owen may refer to:

 Bill Owen (actor) (1914–1999), English actor and songwriter
 Bill Owen (American football) (1903–1975), American football player
 Bill Owen (writer and announcer) (born 1931), hosted the ABC television documentary series, Discovery, 1966–1971
 Bill Owen, a fictional character in The Old Man in the Corner stories by Baroness Orczy
Bill Owen (footballer) (1906–1981), English footballer with Manchester United, Reading, Exeter City and Newport County
 Bill Owen (baseball), head baseball coach at the University of Oklahoma, 1923–1926
 Bill Owen (politician), American politician
Billy Owen (1869–?), English footballer with Wolverhampton Wanderers and Manchester City

See also
William Owen (disambiguation)
Will Owen (disambiguation)
William Owens (disambiguation)